Evangel Allena Champlin Best (January 4, 1892 – February 1974), better known by her pen name Erick Berry, was an American author, illustrator and editor.

Early and personal life

Berry was born on January 4, 1892, in New Bedford, Massachusetts. She was married at least twice, the second time to fellow writer Herbert Best. She derived her pen name from her interest in Eric Pape and the surname of her first husband.

Career

Berry published many children's books from the 1930s to the '60s, and worked as an author, illustrator, and editor. Perhaps the most popular book she wrote was 1933's Winged Girl of Knossos, which she also illustrated. It won a Newbery Honor in 1934. In that year, Anne Dempster Kyle's The Apprentice of Florence, illustrated by Berry, won the same award. She also illustrated several of her husband Best's works, one of which, Garram the Hunter: A Boy of the Hill Tribes, also won a Newbery Honor. She also edited at least one publication, Walter and Marion Havighurst's 1949 children's historical novel Song of the Pines.

Death

Berry died in February 1974, at the age of 82.

Bibliography

As author

As sole author

 Girls in Africa: 1928 (also illustrated)
 Penny-whistle: 1930 (also illustrated)
 Humbo the Hippo and Little-Boy-Bumbo: 1932 (also illustrated)
 Winged Girl of Knossos: 1933 (also illustrated)
 Cynthia Steps Out: 1937
 Homespun: 1937 (illustrated by Harold von Schmidt)
 Honey of the Nile: 1938 (also illustrated)
 Hudson Frontier: 1942 (also illustrated)
 Sybil Ludington's Ride: 1952 (also illustrated)
 Hay-Foot, Straw-Foot: 1954 (also illustrated)
 Green Door to the Sea: 1955 (also illustrated)
 Horses for the General: 1956 (also illustrated)
 The Land and People of Finland: 1959
 The Land and People of Iceland: 1959
 The Four Londons of William Hogarth: 1964
 You Have Got to Go Out: The Story of the United States Coast Guard: 1964
 Mr. Arctic: An Account of Vilhjalmur Stefansson: 1966
 The Springing of the Rice: A Story of Thailand: 1966 (illustrated by John Kaufmann)
 When Wagon Trains Rolled to Santa Fe: 1966 (illustrated by Charles Waterhouse)
 The Magic Banana and Other Polynesian Tales: 1968 (illustrated by Nicholas Amorosi)
 A World Explorer: Fridtjof Nansen: 1969 (illustrated by William Hutchinson)

With Herbert Best

 Men Who Changed the Map: 1968
 The Polynesian Triangle: 1968

As illustrator

Books by Herbert Best

 Garram the Hunter: A Boy of the Hill Tribes: 1930
 Tal of the Four Tribes: 1938
 Gunsmith's Boy: 1942
 The Long Portage: A Story of Ticonderoga and Lord Howe: 1948
 Not Without Danger: 1951
 The Columbus Cannon: 1954
 Underwater Warriors: Story of the American Frogmen: 1967

Books by other authors

 Pinky Pup and The Empty Elephant - Dixie Willson: 1928 
 This Side of Jordan - Roark Bradford: 1929 (Harper & Brothers) and 1930 (William Heinemann Ltd)
 Bee of the Cactus Country — Nora Archibald Smith: 1932
 The Apprentice of Florence — Anne Dempster Kyle: 1933
 Araminta — Eva Knox Evans: 1935
 Jerome Anthony — Eva Knox Evans: 1936
 The Polynesian Triangle — Eleanor Weakley Nolen: 1938
 Key Corner — Eva Knox Evans: 1938
 The Pilgrim Goose — Keith Robertson: 1956

As editor

 Song of the Pines — Walter and Marion Havighurst: 1949

References

1892 births
1974 deaths
20th-century American novelists
American children's writers
American women novelists
Newbery Honor winners
20th-century American women writers